
The following is a list of operas and operettas with entries in Wikipedia. The entries are sorted alphabetically by title, with the name of the composer and the year of the first performance also given.

For a list of operas sorted by name of composer, see List of operas by composer.

Alphabetical listing

0–9

 1000 Airplanes on the Roof, Philip Glass, 1988
 1492 epopea lirica d'America, Antonio Braga, 1992
 1984, Lorin Maazel, 2005
 Le 66, Jacques Offenbach, 1856

A

 L'abandon d'Ariane, Darius Milhaud, 1928
 Abu Hassan, Carl Maria von Weber, 1811
 Acante et Céphise, Jean-Philippe Rameau, 1751
 Achille et Polyxène, Jean-Baptiste Lully, Pascal Collasse, 1687
 Acis and Galatea, George Frideric Handel, 1718
 Acis et Galatée, Jean-Baptiste Lully, 1686
 Actéon, Marc-Antoine Charpentier, 1683–1685
 Adelaide, Antonio Sartorio, 1672
 Adelaide di Borgogna, Gioachino Rossini, 1817
 Adelia, Gaetano Donizetti, 1841
 Adelson e Salvini, Vincenzo Bellini, 1825
 Admeto, Handel, 1727
 Adriana Lecouvreur, Francesco Cilea, 1902
 Adriana Mater, Kaija Saariaho, 2008
 The Adventures of Pinocchio, Jonathan Dove, 2007
 L'Africaine, Giacomo Meyerbeer, 1865
 After All!, Alfred Cellier, 1878
 Ages Ago, Frederic Clay, 1869
 Agrippina, Handel, 1709
 Die ägyptische Helena, Richard Strauss, 1928
 Aida, Giuseppe Verdi, 1871
 Ainadamar, Osvaldo Golijov, 2003
 Akhnaten, Philip Glass, 1984
 Alahor in Granata, Gaetano Donizetti, 1826
 Albert Herring, Britten, 1947
 Alceste, Gluck, 1767
 Alceste, Handel, 1750
 Alceste, Lully, 1674
 Alcina, Handel, 1735
 Alessandro, Handel, 1726
 Alessandro nelle Indie, Pacini, 1824
 Alexander Twice, Martinů, 1964
 Alzira, Verdi, 1845
 Amadis, Lully, 1684
 Amadis, Massenet, 1922
 Amahl and the Night Visitors, Menotti, 1951
 An American Tragedy, Picker, 2005
 Amelia, Hagen, 2010
 L'amico Fritz, Pietro Mascagni, 1891
 L'Amour de loin, Kaija Saariaho, 2000
 Andrea Chénier, Giordano, 1896
 L'Ange de Nisida, Donizetti, 1839
 Angelo, Cui, 1876
 Aniara, Blomdahl, 1959
 Anna Bolena, Donizetti, 1830
 Anna Nicole, Mark-Anthony Turnage, 2011
 Antigonae, Orff, 1949
 Apollo et Hyacinthus, Wolfgang Amadeus Mozart, 1767
 Aquarius, Karel Goeyvaerts, 2009
 Arabella, Richard Strauss, 1933
 Ariadne auf Naxos, R. Strauss, 1912
 Ariodante, Handel, 1734
 Arizona Lady, Emmerich Kálmán, 1954
 L'arlesiana, Cilea, 1897
 Armida, Dvořák, 1904
 Armida, Rossini, 1817
 Armide, Gluck, 1777
 Armide, Lully, 1686
 Aroldo, Verdi, 1857
 Artamene, Tomaso Albinoni, 1741
 Les arts florissants, Charpentier, 1685
 Ascanio in Alba, Mozart, 1771
 Assassinio nella cattedrale, Pizzetti, 1958
 Atmen gibt das Leben, Stockhausen, 1977
 Attila, Verdi, 1846
 Atys, Lully, 1676
 Aufstieg und Fall der Stadt Mahagonny, Weill, 1930

B

 Babes in Toyland, Herbert, 1903
 Babylon, Widmann, 2012
 Die Bajadere, Kálmán, 1921
 Un ballo in maschera, Verdi, 1859
 Bandanna, Hagen, 1998
 Bang!, Rutter, 1975
 Der Barbier von Bagdad, Cornelius, 1858
 Il barbiere di Siviglia, Rossini, 1816
 The Bartered Bride, Smetana, 1866
 Beatrix Cenci, Ginastera, 1971
 Béatrice et Bénédict, Berlioz, 1862
 The Beggar's Opera, Gay, 1728
 Belisario, Donizetti, 1836
 La belle au bois dormant, Carafa, 1825
 La belle au bois dormant, Lecocq, 1900
 La belle Hélène, Offenbach, 1864
 Il Bellerofonte, Mysliveček, 1767
 Benvenuto Cellini, Berlioz, 1838
 Bertha, Rorem, 1973
 Betrothal in a Monastery, Prokofiev, 1946
 Billy Budd, Britten, 1951
 Bitter Sweet, Coward, 1929
 Blue Monday/135th Street, Gershwin, 1929
 Bluebeard's Castle, Bartók, 1918
 La bohème, Puccini, 1896
 La bohème, Leoncavallo, 1897
 Bomarzo, Ginastera, 1967
 Les Boréades, Rameau, 1770
 Boris Godunov, Mussorgsky, 1874
 The Brandenburgers in Bohemia, Smetana, 1866
 The Bravest Hussar, Jacobi, 1905
 Brundibár, Krása, 1943

C

 Ça Ira, Waters, 2005
 Candide, Bernstein, 1956
 La canterina, Haydn, 1766
 Capriccio, Richard Strauss, 1942
 The Captain's Daughter, Cui, 1911
 Cardillac, Paul Hindemith, 1926
 Carmen, Bizet, 1875
 Casanova's Homecoming, Argento, 1985
 Cavalleria rusticana, Mascagni, 1890
 The Cave, Reich, 1994
 Cendrillon, Massenet, 1899
 La Cenerentola, Rossini, 1817
 La Cenicienta, Hen, 1966
 Champion, Terence Blanchard, 2013
 Charles VI, Halévy, 1843
 Charlotte Corday, Lorenzo Ferrero, 1989
 Chopin, Giacomo Orefice, 1901
 Le Cid, Massenet, 1885
 La clemenza di Tito, Mozart, 1791
 Cold Mountain, Jennifer Higdon, 2015
 Comedy on the Bridge, Martinů, 1937
 Le comte Ory, Rossini, 1828
 La Conquista, Ferrero, 2005
 Les contes d'Hoffmann, Offenbach, 1881
 Der Corregidor, Wolf, 1896
 Così fan tutte, Mozart, 1790
 Confessions of a Justified Sinner, Thomas Wilson, 1976 Scottish Opera 
 The Countess, Moniuszko, 1860
 Covid fan tutte, Mozart, 2020
 The Crucible, Ward, 1961
 Die Csárdásfürstin, Kálmán, 1915
 The Cunning Little Vixen, Janáček, 1924
 La Curandera, Robert Xavier Rodriguez, 2006
 Curlew River, Britten, 1964
 Cyrano de Bergerac, Alfano, 1936

D

 Dafne, Peri, 1597
 Dalibor, Smetana, 1868
 La damnation de Faust, Berlioz, 1893
 The Dangerous Liaisons, Susa, 1994
 Dantons Tod, Einem, 1947
 Daphne, Strauss, 1938
 Dardanus, Rameau, 1739
 Dardanus, Sacchini, 1784
 Dead Man Walking, Heggie, 2000
 Death in Venice, Britten, 1973
 The Death of Klinghoffer, Adams, 1991
 The Desert Song, Romberg, 1926
 Destiny, Leoš Janáček, 1934
 The Devil and Kate, Dvořák, 1899
 The Devil Take Her, Benjamin, 1931
 Dialogues des Carmélites, Poulenc, 1957
 Dido and Aeneas, Purcell, 1689
 Dienstag aus Licht, Stockhausen, 1993
 Djamileh, Bizet, 1872
 Doctor Atomic, John Adams, 2005
 Dolores Claiborne, Picker, 2013
 Don Carlos, Verdi, 1867
 Don Giovanni, Mozart, 1787
 Don Pasquale, Donizetti, 1843
 Don Rodrigo, Ginastera, 1964
 Don Sanche, ou le Château d'Amour, Liszt, 1825
 La donna del lago, Rossini, 1819
 Le donne curiose, Wolf-Ferrari, 1903
 Donnerstag aus Licht, Stockhausen, 1981
 Dr. Sun Yat-sen, Huang Ruo, 2014
 I due Foscari, Verdi, 1844

E

 Edgar, Puccini, 1899
 The Eighth Wonder, John, 1995
 Einstein on the Beach, Glass, 1976
 Elektra, R. Strauss, 1909
 L'elisir d'amore, Donizetti, 1832
 Emmeline, Picker, 1996
 L'enfant et les sortilèges, Ravel, 1925
 The English Cat, Henze, 1983
 Die Entführung aus dem Serail, Mozart, 1782
 Ernani, Verdi, 1844
 Ero s onoga svijeta, Gotovac, 1935
 Esclarmonde, Massenet, 1888
 L'étoile, Chabrier, 1877
 Eugene Onegin, Tchaikovsky, 1879
 Euridice, Peri, 1600
 Euryanthe, Weber, 1823
 Evangeline, Luening, 1986
 Everest, Talbot, 2015
 The Excursions of Mr. Broucek, Janáček, 1920

F

 Facing Goya, Nyman, 2000
 The Fair at Sorochyntsi, Mussorgsky, 1913
 Falstaff, Verdi, 1893
 La fanciulla del West, Puccini, 1910
 Fantastic Mr. Fox, Picker, 1998
 Die Faschingsfee, Kálmán, 1917
 Faust, Gounod, 1859
 La favorite, Donizetti, 1840
 A Feast in Time of Plague, Cui, 1901
 A Feast in the Time of Plague, Alex Woolf, 2020
 Fedora, Giordano, 1898
 Die Feen, Wagner, 1833
 Feuersnot, Richard Strauss, 1901
 Fidelio, Beethoven, 1805
 The Fiery Angel, Prokofiev, 1955
 La figlia del mago, Ferrero, 1981
 La fille du régiment, Donizetti, 1840
 The Finnish Prisoner, Orlando Gough, 2007
 Fire Shut Up in My Bones, Terence Blanchard, 2019
 Die Fledermaus, J. Strauss, 1874
 Le Flibustier, Cui, 1894
 Der fliegende Holländer, Wagner, 1843
 Florencia en el Amazonas, Catán, 1996
 La forza del destino, Verdi, 1862
 Four Saints in Three Acts, Thomson, 1934
 Francesca da Rimini, Zandonai, 1914
 Francesca da Rimini, Rachmaninoff, 1906
 Der Freischütz, Weber, 1821
 Freitag aus Licht, Stockhausen, 1996
 From the House of the Dead, Janáček, 1930

G

 Galileo Galilei, Glass, 2002
 The Gambler Prokofiev, 1929
 La gazza ladra Rossini, 1817
 Geneviève de Brabant, Offenbach, 1859
 Genoveva Schumann, 1850
 Das Gesicht im Spiegel, Widmann, 2003
 The Ghosts of Versailles, Corigliano, 1991
 Gianni Schicchi, Puccini, 1918
 Gilgamesh, Brucci, 1986
 La Gioconda, Ponchielli, 1876
 Un giorno di regno, Verdi, 1840
 Giovanna d'Arco, Verdi, 1845
 Giulio Cesare, Handel, 1724
 Gloriana, Britten, 1953
 The Golden Cockerel, Rimsky-Korsakov, 1907
 The Gondoliers, Gilbert and Sullivan, 1889
 Götterdämmerung, Wagner, 1876
 Goyescas, Granados, 1916
 The Grand Duke, Gilbert and Sullivan, 1896
 Le Grand Macabre, Ligeti, 1978
 The Greater Good, or the Passion of Boule de Suif, Hartke, 2006
 The Great Friendship, Muradeli, 1947
 The Greek Passion, Martinů, 1961
 Il Guarany, Carlos Gomes 1870
 Guillaume Tell, Rossini, 1829

H

 Hagith, Karol Szymanowski, 1922
 Halka, Moniuszko, 1854
 The Handmaid's Tale, Poul Ruders, 2000
 Hänsel und Gretel, Humperdinck, 1893
 Háry János, Kodály, 1926
 The Haughty Princess, Jacobi, 1904
 The Haunted Manor, Moniuszko, 1865
 Die heilige Ente, Gál, 1923
 Helvellyn, Macfarren, 1864
 Die Herzogin von Chicago, Kálmán, 1928
 L'heure espagnole, Ravel, 1911
 HMS Pinafore, Gilbert and Sullivan, 1878
 Die Hochzeit, Wagner, not performed
 Hugh the Drover, Vaughan Williams, 1924
 Les Huguenots, Meyerbeer, 1836

I

 The Ice Break, Tippett, 1977
 Idomeneo, Mozart 1781
 L'incoronazione di Poppea, Monteverdi, 1642
 Les Indes galantes, Rameau, 1735
 Iolanta, Tchaikovsky, 1892
 Iolanthe, Gilbert and Sullivan, 1882
 Iphigénie en Tauride, Gluck, 1779
 Iris, Mascagni, 1899
 The Island of Tulipatan, Offenbach, 1868
 L'italiana in Algeri, Rossini, 1813
 Ivan the Fool, Cui (first performance undetermined)J

 The Jacobin, Dvořák, 1889
 Jenůfa, Janáček, 1904
 Jérusalem, Giuseppe Verdi, 1847
 The Jewels of the Madonna, Wolf-Ferrari, 1911
 Judith, Serov, 1863
 Juha, Aarre Merikanto, 1922/63
 La Juive, Halévy, 1835
 Julie, Boesmans, 2005

K

 Der Kaiser von Atlantis, Ullmann, 1975
 Kaiserin Josephine, Kálmán, 1936
 Die Kalewainen in Pochjola, K. Müller-Berghaus, 1890/2017
 Káťa Kabanová, Janáček, 1921
 The Khovansky Affair, Modest Mussorgsky, 1886
 King Roger, Karol Szymanowski, 1926
 King Priam, Michael Tippett, 1962
 Koanga, Frederick Delius, 1935
 The Knot Garden, Michael Tippett, 1970
 Krútňava, Eugen Suchoň, 1949

L

 Lady Macbeth of the Mtsensk District, Shostakovich, 1934
 Lakmé, Delibes, 1883
 Das Land des Lächelns, Lehár, 1929
 The Legend of the Invisible City of Kitezh, Rimsky-Korsakov, 1912
 Leo, the Royal Cadet, Oscar Ferdinand Telgmann, George Frederick Cameron, 1889
 The Letter, Paul Moravec, 2009
 La liberazione di Ruggiero, Caccini, 1625
 Das Liebesverbot, Wagner, 1836
 Life is a Dream, Lewis Spratlan, 2010
 The Little Prince, Portman, 2003
 Little Red Riding Hood, Cui, (1921?)
 Little Women (opera), Mark Adamo, 1999
 Lohengrin, Wagner, 1850
 I Lombardi alla prima crociata, Verdi, 1843
 Lord Byron, Thomson, 1972
 Loreley, Catalani, 1890
 Louise, Charpentier, 1900
 Louis Riel, Somers, 1967
 The Love for Three Oranges, Prokofiev, 1921
 Lucia di Lammermoor, Donizetti, 1835
 Lucio Silla, Mozart, 1772
 Lucrezia Borgia, Donizetti, 1834
 Luisa Miller, Verdi, 1849
 Lulu, Berg, 1937
 Die lustige Witwe, Lehár, 1905
 Die lustigen Weiber von Windsor, Nicolai, 1849

M

 Macbeth, Verdi, 1844
 Madama Butterfly, Puccini, 1904
 Mademoiselle Fifi, Cui, 1903
 The Maid of Orleans, Tchaikovsky 1881
 The Makropulos Affair, Janáček, 1926
 Les mamelles de Tirésias Poulenc 1947
 The Man and Men, Joshua Goodman, 2010
 The Man Who Mistook His Wife for a Hat, Nyman 1986
 The Mandarin's Son Cui, 1878
 Manon, Massenet, 1884
 Manon Lescaut, Puccini, 1893
 Maometto II, Gioachino Rossini, 1820
 Mare nostro, Lorenzo Ferrero, 1985
 Margaret Garner, Danielpour, 2005
 María de Buenos Aires, Piazzolla, 1968
 Maria Golovin, Menotti 1958
 Maria Stuarda Donizetti, 1835
 Marilyn, Ferrero, 1980
 The Marriage Market, Jacobi, 1911 
 Martha, Flotow, 1847
 Les martyrs, Donizetti, 1840
 The Mask of Orpheus, Birtwistle, 1968
 I masnadieri, Verdi, 1847
 Masquerade, Nielsen, 1906
 Mateo Falcone, Cui, 1907
 Mathis der Maler, Hindemith 1938
 Il matrimonio segreto, Cimarosa, 1792
 Mavra, Stravinsky, 1922
 May Night, Rimsky-Korsakov, 1880
 Mazepa (or Mazeppa), Tchaikovsky, 1884
 Médée, Cherubini, 1797
 Médée, Charpentier, 1693
 The Medium, Menotti, 1946
 Mefistofele, Boito, 1868
 Die Meistersinger von Nürnberg, Wagner, 1868
 The Merchant Kalashnikov, Anton Rubinstein, 1880
 La Merope, Giacomelli, 1734
 The Midsummer Marriage, Michael Tippett, 1955
 A Midsummer Night's Dream, Britten, 1960
 Mignon, Thomas, 1866
 The Mikado, Gilbert and Sullivan, 1885
 The Mines of Sulphur, Bennett, 1963
 The Miserly Knight, Rachmaninoff, 1906
 Miss Julie, Rorem, 1965
 Mittwoch aus Licht, Stockhausen, 2012
 Mlada, Cui, Borodin, Mussorgsky, and Rimsky-Korsakov (collaborative work of 1872, never staged)
 Mlada, Rimsky-Korsakov, 1890
 Montag aus Licht, Stockhausen, 1988
 Moses und Aron, Schoenberg, 1957
 The Most Important Man, 1957
 Motezuma, Vivaldi, 1733
 Mozart and Salieri, Rimsky-Korsakov, 1898

N

 Nabucco, Verdi, 1842
 Eine Nacht in Venedig, J. Strauss, 1883
 Nędza uszczęśliwiona, Maciej Kamieński, 1778
 The New Moon, Romberg, 1928
 Nicholas and Alexandra, Drattell, 2003
 The Nightingale, Stravinsky, 1914
 Nina, Paisiello, 1789
 El Niño, John Adams, 2000
 Nixon in China, Adams, 1987
 Norma, Bellini, 1831
 The Nose, Shostakovich, 1930
 Le nozze di Figaro, Mozart, 1786

O

 Oberto, conte di San Bonifacio, Verdi, 1839
 L'oca del Cairo, Mozart, 1783
 Oédipe, George Enescu 1936
 Oedipus Rex, Igor Stravinsky 1927
 The Old Maid and the Thief, Menotti, 1939
 Operation Orfeo, Bo Holten, 1993
 Das Opfer, Winfried Zillig, 1937
 L'Oracolo, Franco Leoni, 1905
 Oresteia, Taneyev, 1895
 L'Orfeo, Monteverdi, 1607
 Orfeo ed Euridice, Gluck, 1762
 Orlando furioso, Vivaldi, 1727
 Orphée aux enfers, Offenbach, 1858
 Orphée et Eurydice, Gluck, 1774
 Oscar, Theodore Morrison, 2013
 Otello, Verdi 1887
 Otello, Rossini, 1816
 Owen Wingrave, Britten, 1971

P

 Pagliacci, Leoncavallo, 1892
 Paradise Lost, Penderecki, 1978
 Parsifal, Wagner, 1882
 Patience, Gilbert and Sullivan, 1881
 Le Pays, Ropartz, 1912
 Les pêcheurs de perles, Bizet, 1863
 Pelléas et Mélisande, Debussy, 1902
 Peter Grimes, Britten, 1945
 Le piccole storie, Ferrero, 2007 
 The Pirates of Penzance, Gilbert and Sullivan, 1879
 Polyphème, Cras, 1945
 Porgy and Bess, Gershwin, 1935
 Porin, Lisinski, 1851
 Powder Her Face, Thomas Adès, 1995
 The Power of the Fiend, Serov, 1871
 Prince Igor, Borodin, 1890
 Princess Ida, Gilbert and Sullivan, 1884
 Prisoner of the Caucasus, Cui, 1883
 I puritani, Bellini, 1835
 Puss in Boots, Cui, 1915

Q

 I quattro rusteghi, Wolf-Ferrari, 1906
 The Queen of Spades, Tchaikovsky, 1890
 A Quiet Place, Bernstein, 1983

R

 Radamisto, Handel, 1720
 The Rake's Progress, Stravinsky, 1951
 The Rape of Lucretia, Britten, 1946
 Il rè pastore, Mozart, 1775
 El retablo de Maese Pedro, de Falla, 1923
 Das Rheingold, Wagner, 1869
 Rienzi, Wagner, 1842
 Rigoletto, Verdi, 1851
 Rinaldo, Handel, 1711
 Der Ring des Nibelungen, Wagner, 1876
 Río de Sangre, Don Davis, 2010
 Risorgimento!, Lorenzo Ferrero, 2011
 Il ritorno d'Ulisse in patria, Monteverdi, 1640
 Roberto Devereux, Donizetti, 1837
 Rodelinda, Handel, 1725
 Rogneda, Serov, 1865
 Le Roi Arthus, Ernest Chausson, 1903
 Le roi de Lahore, Massenet, 1877
 Roméo et Juliette, Gounod, 1867
 La rondine, Puccini, 1917
 Der Rosenkavalier, R. Strauss, 1911
 The Rose of Castille, Michael Balfe, 1857
 Ruddigore, Gilbert and Sullivan, 1887
 Rusalka, Dargomyzhsky, 1856
 Rusalka, Dvořák, 1901
 Ruslan and Lyudmila, Glinka, 1842

S

 Sadko, Rimsky-Korsakov, 1898
 Saint-François d'Assise, Messiaen, 1983
 The Saint of Bleecker Street, Menotti, 1954
 Salammbô, Reyer, 1890
 Salome, R. Strauss, 1905
 Salvatore Giuliano, Lorenzo Ferrero, 1986
 Samson, Handel, 1743
 Samstag aus Licht, Stockhausen, 1984
 Samson et Dalila, Saint-Saëns, 1877
 Il Sant'Alessio, Landi, 1632
 The Saracen, Cui, 1899
 Šárka, Janáček, 1925
 Satyagraha, Glass, 1980
 The Scarecrow, Turrin, 2006
 The Scarlet Letter, Laitman, 2008, rev. 2016
 Der Schauspieldirektor, Mozart, 1786
 Der Schmied von Gent, Schreker, 1932
 Die Schuldigkeit des ersten Gebots, Mozart, 1767
 Schwanda the Bagpiper, Weinberger, 1927
 Semele, Eccles, written 1707
 Semele, Handel, 1744
 Semiramide, Rossini, 1823
 Serse, Handel, 1738
 Shell Shock, Nicholas Lens, 2014
 Le siège de Corinthe, Rossini, 1826
 Shining Brow, Hagen, 1992
 Siegfried, Wagner, 1876
 Simon Boccanegra, Verdi, 1857
 Simplicius, J. Strauss, 1887
 The Skating Rink, Sawer, 2018
 Slow Man, Nicholas Lens, 2012
 The Snow Bogatyr, Cui, 1906
 The Snow Maiden, Rimsky-Korsakov, 1882
 Il sogno di Scipione, Mozart, 1772
 La sonnambula, Bellini, 1831
 Sonntag aus Licht, Stockhausen, 2011
 The Sorcerer, Gilbert and Sullivan, 1877
 Sorochintsy Fair — see The Fair at Sorochyntsi
 Lo sposo deluso, Mozart, 1783
 Stiffelio, Giuseppe Verdi, 1850
 The Stone Guest, Dargomyzhsky, 1872
 Street Scene, Weill, 1947
 Suor Angelica, Puccini, 1918
 Susannah, Floyd, 1955
 Svätopluk, Suchoň, 1960
 Szibill, Jacobi, 1914

T

 Il tabarro, Puccini, 1918
 The Tale of Tsar Saltan, Rimsky-Korsakov, 1900
 Tancredi, Rossini, 1813
 Tannhäuser und der Sängerkrieg auf Wartburg, Wagner, 1845
 Tartuffe, Mechem, 1980
 Tea: A Mirror of Soul, Tan Dun, 2007
 De temporum fine comoedia, Orff, 1973
 The Tempest, Thomas Adès, 2004
 The Tender Land, Copland, 1954
 Thérèse Raquin, Picker, 2001
 The Three Feathers, Laitman, 2014
 Thaïs (opera), Massenet, 1894
 The Threepenny Opera, Weill, 1928
 Three Tales, Reich, 2002
 Tiefland, Eugen d'Albert, 1911
 Tosca, Puccini 1900
 La traviata, Verdi, 1853
 Treemonisha, Joplin, 1911
 Trial by Jury, Gilbert and Sullivan, 1875
 Tristan und Isolde, Wagner, 1865
 Trouble in Tahiti, Bernstein, 1952
 Il trovatore, Verdi, 1853
 Troy, Bujor Hoinic 2018
 Les Troyens, Berlioz 1863
 The Tsar's Bride, Rimsky-Korsakov, 1899
 Turandot, Puccini, 1926
 Il turco in Italia, Rossini, 1814
 The Turn of the Screw, Britten, 1954

U

 ’u’, Eef van Breen, 2010
 Utopia Limited, Gilbert and Sullivan, 1893

V

 Vanessa, Barber, 1958
 Veinticinco de agosto, 1983, Solare, 1992
 Verbum nobile, Moniuszko, 1861
 La vestale, Spontini, 1807
 Il viaggio a Reims, Rossini, 1825
 La vida breve, de Falla, 1913
 Le Villi, Puccini, 1884
 Violanta, Korngold, 1916
 Violet, Roger Scruton, 2005
 Volo di notte, Dallapiccola, 1940
 Les vêpres siciliennes, Verdi, 1855
 Venus and Adonis, Blow, c.1683
 Vera of Las Vegas, Hagen, 1996

W

 Die Walküre, Wagner, 1870
 La Wally, Catalani, 1892
 War and Peace, Prokofiev, 1946
 A Wedding, Bolcom, 2004
 Weiße Rose by Udo Zimmermann; 1st version 1967; 2nd version 1986
 Werther, Massenet, 1892
 What Men Live By, Martinů, 1953
 Written on Skin, George Benjamin, 2012
 William Ratcliff, Cui, 1869
 Wozzeck, Berg, 1925
 Wuthering Heights, Floyd, 1958
 Wuthering Heights, Herrmann, 1982

X

 X, The Life and Times of Malcolm X, Davis, 1986

Y

 The Yeomen of the Guard, Gilbert and Sullivan, 1888
 Yerma, Villa-Lobos, 1971

Z

 Zaide, Mozart, 1866 (written 1780)
 Die Zauberflöte, Mozart, 1791

See also

 List of important operas
 List of operas by composer

 
Operas